Euchlaena deductaria, the forked euchlaena moth, is a species of moth of the  family Geometridae. It is found in North America, where it has been recorded from Alabama, Arkansas, Florida, Georgia, Kentucky, Maine, Maryland, New York, North Carolina, Ohio, Oklahoma, South Carolina, Tennessee, Texas and West Virginia.

The wingspan is about 42 mm. Adults are on wing from April to August.

Taxonomy
The name Euchlaella pectillaria was erroneously applied to this species, while the American species is to be correctly called by its previously considered junior synonym, Euchlaella deductaria. The name pectillaria is a junior synonym of the European species Odontopera bidentata.

References

Moths described in 1860
Angeronini